Festival Latinoamericano, or Latin American Festival, is an annual three-day Labor Day weekend festival in downtown Provo, Utah. The festival highlights Utah's Hispanic culture through food, vendors, and performances and is free to the public. Festival Latinoamericano. It is currently in year  .

History and Purpose
During the first year in 2001, the Festival was held at the Boulders Apartment Complex with about 75 attendants. The inaugural festival was a giant success, and quickly outgrew its South Provo location. The festival has since become a large yearly event in downtown Provo on the Utah County Historic Courthouse grounds on University Avenue and Center Street. In the last six years the festival has maintained an attendance of approximately 30,000 visitors.

The Festival's purpose is to provide a venue for nonprofit organizations and new companies to provide their services to the Hispanic population. The audience at this event is not restricted to the state of Utah; there are visitors from multiple states including California, Wyoming, and Nevada.

The event showcases local performers of Latin dance and music, and also allows attendees to further explore Latin-American cuisine and culture through dozens of various vendors. Other attractions include carnival rides and lucha libre.

There was no festival in 2020.

See also
 List of festivals in the United States
 Provo, Utah
 Centro Hispano

External links
Official Site of Festival Latinoamericano
Official Site of Centro Hispano

Notes

Festivals in Utah
Hispanic and Latino American culture in Utah
Tourist attractions in Provo, Utah
Cultural festivals in the United States
Festivals established in 2002
2002 establishments in Utah
Latin American festivals